An American Affair, also known as Boy of Pigs, is a 2008 American independent period drama film directed by William Olsson and starring Gretchen Mol, James Rebhorn, Noah Wyle, Perrey Reeves, Mark Pellegrino, and Cameron Bright. It was released theatrically by Screen Media Films on February 27, 2009.

The film was produced in 2008, written by Alex Metcalf, and produced by Kevin Leydon. Its soundtrack was created by Dustin O'Halloran. It premiered at the 2008 Zurich Film Festival under the title Boy of Pigs.

Plot 
In 1963, in the swirl of glamour and intrigue that turned President John F. Kennedy's Washington into Camelot, a young teenager, Adam Stafford (Cameron Bright) has an inside view of JFK’s torrid affair with Adam's neighbor Catherine (Gretchen Mol) and secret CIA assassination plans. The assassination plan was influenced by a Cuban national in which America was having a revolutionary threat from Fidel Castro.  Catherine kept a diary which entries were about the secrets of the President. This diary was secretly stolen from Catherine by Adam Stafford when she fell asleep. The contents of this diary were the cause of her murder by the CIA, presumably.

Adam is a thirteen year old boy attending Catholic school.  Catherine moves across the street and she hires Adam to do some gardening.  Adam falls in love with his unattainable thirty something blonde beauty.  His parents warn him that she has a reputation.  In fact she is an artist and has been having an affair with President JFK.  She is divorced from a man who works for the CIA. CIA operative Lucian keeps tabs on Catherine.  Adam finds and keeps Catherine's diary.  JFK is assassinated.  Lucian comes to the Stafford home, searches and finds the diary, and burns the book telling Adam that sometimes people get confused with what is really true.  Adam finds Catherine at the bottom of stairs dead.

The Catherine Caswell character and the events not involving the wholly fictional Adam Stafford are based on true life Mary Pinchot Meyer. The character CIA Agent Lucian Carver is heavily based on longtime CIA counterintelligence chief James Angleton, who was a well-known associate of both Mary Pinchot Meyer and her former husband Cord Meyer who was also a CIA official.

Cast 
 Gretchen Mol as Catherine Caswell - Artist, divorcee, paramour of JFK, and neighbor (Based on Mary Pinchot Meyer) 
 Cameron Bright as Adam Stafford - Teen neighbor
 Noah Wyle as Mike Stafford - Adam's father
 Perrey Reeves as Adrienne Stafford - Adam's mother
 Mark Pellegrino as Graham Caswell - Catherine's former husband (Based on Cord Meyer)
 James Rebhorn as Lucian Carver - CIA agent (Based on James Angleton)
 Lisa-Lisbeth Finney as Sister Mary Eunice - Teacher
 Laurel Astri as Faith - Adam's first kiss

Reception
Betsy Sharkey, film critic for the Los Angeles Times, found the film an affair not to remember. She stated it is a "mess of a film that can't quite figure out what it wants to be: an illicit love story, a political thriller or a coming-of-age set piece". She did like the acting of Gretchen Mol.

See also 
 Cultural depictions of John F. Kennedy

References

External links 
 

2008 films
2008 comedy-drama films
American independent films
American coming-of-age films
American political drama films
Films set in the 1960s
Films about John F. Kennedy
Cultural depictions of John F. Kennedy
Films scored by Dustin O'Halloran
2000s English-language films
2000s American films